Petronella Tshuma (born 13 January 1990) is a Zimbabwean-born actress. She won Most Promising Actor at the 10th Africa Movie Academy Awards. She also received a Golden horn best actress in a leading role nomination for her role in Of Good Report.

She has featured in several South-African television series including Scandal, Hustle, Mzansi Love, Sokhulu & Partners and 90 Plein Street. She currently plays the character of Pearl Genaro on etv's Rhythm City.

Early life
Tshuma was born in Zimbabwe and moved to South Africa at the age of five. It was at church in downtown Johannesburg in 1997 that she fell in love with acting, landing her first role in a nativity stage play. As her love for story telling grew, she began to perform in school plays and in the local Yeovill, Hillbrow and Berea area.

In 2001, Petronella moved to the United Kingdom to live with her father in Bristol. She attended Filton High School where she continued to pursue drama, playing Carmen in a production of Fame and received a BTECH in Acting from the school's SWADA department.

References

External links
 

1990 births
South African film actresses
21st-century South African actresses
Living people